Babolsar (also Romanized as Bābolsar and Bābul Sar; also known as Mashhadsar (Persian: مَشهَدسَر), also Romanized as Mashhad-i-Sar and Meshed-i-Sar) is a city and capital of Babolsar County, Mazandaran Province, Iran. It is located alongside the Caspian Sea.

At the 2016 census, the city population was 75,761, in 24,666 families.

Geography
Babolsar is located on the southern coast of the Caspian Sea. Since the Babol river passes through the city, both the bank of the river and the beach of the sea form tourist attractions in the city. The city is home to the major faculties of the University of Mazandaran.

History
The city acquired its current name in 1927. The city's historic name is MaÞhad-e Sar or Mashhadsar, meaning "the special way to Mashhad, referring to the only road connecting the northwest of Iran to the northeast, including Mashhad, which passed through Babolsar. By the 18th century, Babolsar had become a busy commercial port. During the reign of Nadir Shah, it was the base for Iran's Caspian fleet. By 1909, the port yielded 12 percent of the total customs revenue of Iran. However, by 1895, ports in Gilan were already competing with Babolsar.

During Reza Shah's reign, Babolsar lost much of its remaining trade to the new port of Bandar-e Shah at the terminus of the trans-Iranian railroad. The cargo handled at Babolsar in the years of 1935 and 1936 was only 25,000 tons. A modern quarter and a hotel were built during this period. The end of World War II brought a new era of vitality to the city as a summer seaside resort for people from Iran, which gave rise to a new phase of rapid expansion. Babolsar's population increased from about 3,500 in 1945 to 11,781 in 1966 and 18,810 in 1976.

Climate
Babolsar has a humid subtropical climate (Köppen: Cfa, Trewartha: Cf), with hot, steamy, but mostly dry summers and cool winters. Rainfall may occur at any time of the year but is heaviest in autumn and winter.

Tourist Attractions
 Babolsar Suspended Bridge
 Babolsar Seaside
 Babol Roud
 University of Mazandaran Building
 Khazar Shahr
 Narjes School
 Imamzadeh Ibrahim
 Azizak Lagoon
 Mirud
 Babolsar Boating Pier
 Babolsar Cable  Bridge
 Zoo Garden Shapoor Dashad
 Kar Fun

Residence 
The city is popular because of its many hotels and villas as well as the Darya Kenar Town, located 5 kilometers outside Babolsar, were many Iranians vacation.
 Mizban Hotel

Education

Universities

University of Mazandaran (UMZ), currently the largest state higher education center in the province of Mazandaran, had formerly consisted of a number of tertiary education centers. In 1979 the centers were officially merged to form what is now known as University of Mazandaran.  In recent years, UMZ has made significant progress, expanding itself with vision both qualitatively and quantitatively. It presently includes 12 faculties on its campus: Faculty of Mathematical Sciences, Faculty of Theology and Islamic Sciences, Faculty of Marine and Oceanic Sciences, Faculty of Basic Sciences, Faculty of Arts and Architecture, Faculty of Law and Political Sciences, Faculty of Physical Education and Sports Sciences, Faculty of Humanities and Social Sciences, Faculty of Economics and Administrative Sciences, Faculty of Chemistry, Faculty of Technology and Engineering, and Faculty of Cultural Heritage, Handicrafts and Tourism.

UMZ has now about 12,000 students who are currently studying at undergraduate, graduate, and post-graduate levels and over 400 faculty members teaching and researching at different faculties of the university. Until 2016, more than 15,000 students got graduated from different faculties of our university. Based on the policy of the Iranian Ministry of Science, Research and Technology (MSRT), UMZ is committed to providing high-quality education, innovative research at undergraduate, graduate, and post-graduate levels leading to scientific and technological achievements.

Sister city
  Gaeta

References

 Bābolsar entry in the Encyclopædia Iranica

Cities in Mazandaran Province
Populated coastal places in Iran
Populated places on the Caspian Sea
Port cities and towns in Iran
Port cities and towns of the Caspian Sea